The Louisville–Memphis rivalry is a sports rivalry between the University of Louisville Cardinals and University of Memphis Tigers. The two NCAA Division I schools compete in various sports, with men's basketball and college football in particular being prominent. Both schools were represented in a 2008 Sheraton commercial featuring fans of other college sport rivals such as Michigan/Ohio State, Duke/North Carolina, USC/UCLA, and Syracuse/Georgetown.

Men's basketball

The series between the men's basketball programs began in 1949. Louisville leads the series 53–34. The two schools have played in four different conferences – the Missouri Valley Conference, Metro Conference, Conference USA, and for the 2013–14 season only, the American Athletic Conference. Louisville joined the Atlantic Coast Conference in 2014.

Football

See also  
 List of NCAA college football rivalry games

References

College football rivalries in the United States
College basketball rivalries in the United States
College soccer rivalries in the United States
Louisville Cardinals
Memphis Tigers